Sunil Dabas is a coach of national female Kabbadi team of India. Over the years, she has coached her team to win seven international gold medals, including the 2010 Asian Games and the World Cup-2012. She was awarded the Dronacharya Award in 2012, and Padma Shri in 2014 by Government of India.

Biography 
Dabas was born and brought up in Mohammadpur Majra village in Beri tehsil, of Jhajjar district, Haryana, India. After her schooling at her native village, she did her M.A. and Master of Physical Education (MPhEd), from Maharshi Dayanand University, Rohtak, thereafter she did her M. Phil from Kurukshetra University, and Ph.D. in sports psychology from Agra University.

Career 

She has been the coach of national female kabaddi team since 2005. Under her,  the team won seven gold medals in international championships which include 2006 South Asian Games, 2nd Asian Championship in 2007, 3rd Asian Championship in 2007, 2009 South Asian Games, 2010 Asian Games, 2012 Women's Kabaddi World Cup and 4th Indoor Asian Games in 2013.

She is an associate professor and the Head of the Department of Physical Education at Dronacharya Government Post-Graduate College, Gurgaon.

Awards 
She was awarded Dronacharya Award for excellence in sports coaching, by the Government of India, in 2012. She was the first woman coach from Haryana and the fourth in India to receive such award. She was awarded Padma Shri, the fourth highest civilian award in India in 2014. She received Sports Women Achiever Award 2014 from the Government of Haryana.

Bibliography 
She has written and edited following books: 
 Theory of Scientific Sports Training
 Physical Fitness and Yoga
 Principles and Foundations of Physical Education
 Physical Activity and Health
 Health and Yoga
 Sharirik Shikshake Sidhantatatha Mulaadhar (Hindi)
 Sharirik Gatividhiaur Swasthaya (Hindi)
 Swasthevam Yog (Hindi)
 Sharirik fitness and Yog (Hindi)
 SharirikShikshakiPrayogicPustika (Hindi)
 Physical Education Practical Book
 Sports Psychology
 Sports Biomechanics and Kinesiology (Hindi)
 Physical Fitness and Wellness (Hindi)

References 

Year of birth missing (living people)
Living people
Kabaddi in India
Indian sports coaches
People from Jhajjar district
Kabaddi players from Haryana
Recipients of the Dronacharya Award
Recipients of the Padma Shri in sports
Kurukshetra University alumni
National team coaches